Agadu is a 2021 Indian Tamil-language drama film written and directed by S. Suresh Kumar. John Vijay, Siddharth Kumaran and Sriram Karthik appear in the lead roles. Produced by Vidiyal Raju, it was released on 22 October 2021.

Cast 
John Vijay
Siddharth Kumaran
Sriram Karthik
Anjali Nair
Vijay Anand

Production
The film was shot within a month in Kodaikanal.

Release 
The film was released on 22 October 2021 across theatres in Tamil Nadu. Maalai Malar's critic gave the film a positive review, citing it was "interesting". New Cinema Express gave the film a middling review, rating it 2.5 out of 5. A critic from News Today wrote "Agadu joins the list of crime thrillers in Tamil cinema that is engaging in part", while a reviewer from Chennaivision noted "overall, the movie keeps the audience engaged."

References 

2021 drama films
2020s Tamil-language films
2021 films
Indian drama films
2021 directorial debut films